Sperm donation laws vary by country. Most countries have laws to cover sperm donations which, for example, place limits on how many children a sperm donor may give rise to, or which limit or prohibit the use of donor semen after the donor has died, or payment to sperm donors. Other laws may restrict use of donor sperm for in vitro fertilisation (IVF) treatment, which may itself be banned or restricted in some way, such as to married heterosexual couples, banning such treatment to single women or lesbian couples. Donated sperm may be used for insemination (whether natural or artificial) or as part of IVF treatment. Notwithstanding such laws, informal and private sperm donations take place, which are largely unregulated.

Restrictions on sperm donations or the ability to obtain IVF treatment in some jurisdictions has given rise to women traveling to a country which does not impose restrictions in the circumstances in which they finds themselves to obtain such donations or treatments, in a practice called fertility tourism.

Regulation of sperm donations

Number of donations 
Most jurisdictions limit the number of children a sperm donor may give rise to. The main reason to limit sperm donations is the risk of accidental consanguinity or inbreeding between donor offspring. In some countries such limits are voluntary (e.g., Japan and the United States) while in others they are imposed by law, and some jurisdictions do not have any limits. Most jurisdictions which set limits on the number of sperm donations do so in terms of number of donor offspring, but some jurisdictions set the limits in terms of "families", to allow for the children of the recipient woman to be true genetic siblings and because consanguinity issues are caught by a country's incest laws. Most jurisdictions set only local limits, while a number set worldwide limits. Some jurisdictions permit the export of donor sperms, which may not count in the limit on donor offspring, while the import of donor sperm may be subject to local limits.

Recipients
Many countries have restrictions on who can be a recipient of donated sperm. Some countries restrict donations to married heterosexual couples (e.g., Japan), and some to married heterosexual or homosexual couples, while others permit donations to married couples or those in cohabitation relationships. In some jurisdictions such as France, single women and lesbian couples have only been able to receive treatments using donor sperm since 2021. Some jurisdictions have no restrictions on who can receive donated sperm. In some countries only a husband's sperm can be used for insemination.

Rights of donor
The rights of the sperm donor also vary. These involve rights to compensation, anonymity, parental rights, child support obligations, besides other issues. Sperm donation by natural insemination involves other varied moral and legal issues.

Overview table

By country

Australia
Laws relating to assisted reproduction vary between states. Since 1995, when a child becomes an adult, they can apply for the sperm donor's details. Sperm donors are not paid. Demand is high for donor sperm, and laws vary between states as to how many families a donor's sperm can be provided to. In Victoria, there is a limit of 10 families per donor. In Western Australia, the Human Reproductive Technology Act 1991 (HRT Act) limits the number of families for each donor to 5.

Belgium
There is no limit to the number of children born from each donor, however they can only donate to a  maximum of six families. Before the law was changed in July 2007, a medical practitioner could make his or her own decision on the maximum. In the late 1990s Belgian fertility clinics (or sperm banks) imported large amounts of donor sperm from other countries and this led to Belgium becoming a 'fertility destination'. However, the Belgian Parliament became concerned about this and, along with the promulgation of the Tissues Directive by the European Commission, the Government decided radically to alter the laws relating to maximum numbers.

Canada
There is no upper limit to the number of donor offspring in Canada, but sperm banks generally follow the same recommendations as in the US, i.e. a maximum of 25 offspring per population of 800,000.

The Assisted Human Reproduction Act banned compensation for sperm donors and imposed a bureaucratic system described as "cumbersome" on donors, after which time more than 90% of donor sperm used in Canada comes from the U.S. The federal government does not track the number of births by sperm or egg donation, and there is no registry.

Denmark
In Denmark, one donor may give rise to 12 children. Before the new limit was set a donor could help to conceive children in up to 25 families who could use the donor sperm for conceiving siblings even after the limit was reached.

However, Denmark also exports semen worldwide, and where it is the limit of the importing country that is followed, or, when there is no such limit, a fixed amount considering that country's total population, in order to minimise the risk of consanguinity.

Through the export it may result in that some single donors have up to 200 biological children worldwide who are genetic half-siblings

France
In France, donations from a single donor may give rise to six families, but there is no limit to sibling numbers.

Germany
Legislation provides that a donor may not produce more than fifteen children through his donations. The legal position surrounding donations to single mothers and lesbians is still awaiting clarification by the courts. At present a donor can run the risk of paternity proceedings if his donations are used in such cases.

Israel
In Israel, sperm donation is mandated by the Ministry of Health. There are 12 authorized sperm banks and hospitals across the country, and 2 more in private research facilities. Only unmarried, healthy men under the age of 30 are allowed to donate sperm, and they are financially compensated for it. Men who want to donate must get to the hospital, pass an interview and blood-checks, cryotip and DNA checks. They are also prohibited from donating sperm in more than one sperm bank and they can donate a limited times (usually up to 10 children from one donor). Finally, anonymity is kept indefinitely; the donor would never receive information regarding offspring, and vice versa.

New Zealand
In New Zealand, a voluntary policy law by fertility clinics limit one donor to "fathering" a maximum of 10 children to four families.

Around 1996–97, fertility clinics in New Zealand voluntarily agreed they would only accept donations from non-anonymous donors. The Human Assisted Reproductive Technology Act 2004 legislated that all donations made on or after 22 August 2005 must be non-anonymous.

Norway
Clinics in Norway have a maximum of eight children per donor.

Spain
The law provides that there must not be more than six births per donor. The same law applies to egg donations. Prior to the change in the law in 2008, clinics set their own maximums on the numbers of children produced from each donor. Spain was becoming a destination for fertility tourists, i.e. women seeking to become pregnant through the use of donor sperm and Spanish clinics were purchasing donor sperm from other countries in order to satisfy demand (see Onselling in main article). Many UK women were travelling to Spain at that time to be impregnated with sperm imported from clinics in the UK for example, where there were already controls on the numbers of children which each donor could produce.

The change in the law in Spain coincided with Europe-wide discussions on the use and export of human cells.

Sperm donation is only permitted by anonymous donation. Surrogacy is not allowed.

Sweden
In Sweden, a donor may give a child to a maximum of six couples. However, each pair may have a sibling in addition. Thus, the limit is 12 children per donor. Nevertheless, the Swedish National Board of Health and Welfare (Socialstyrelsen) recommends a maximum of 6 children per donor.

Artificial insemination by donor was done only if the woman was married or in registered cohabitation, and required written consent of the spouse or partner. This law has now changed allowing single women access to state funded fertility treatment although long waiting lists may prove prohibitive.

Switzerland
In Switzerland sperm donation is only allowed for married couples—not for unmarried couples or singles. A donor may give rise to a maximum of eight children.

UK
The HFEA sets a limit of 10 families within the UK which can be created using the gametes of one donor. However, there is no limit to the number of children which may be born to each such family from the same donor. A donor may set a lower limit and may impose conditions on the use of his sperm.

Sperm may be exported from the UK but exports are subject to restrictions and have to be notified to the HFEA. Donors must give their permission for export, and normally their donations will not be exported until the 10 family limit within the UK has been reached. In practice this means that only vials from the most fertile donors and those who donate over a longer period of time than the norm, will be exported. Restrictions on exports include ensuring that these are only to approved clinics in any given jurisdiction, and that the use of vials is traceable. Exports to EU states are subject to the EU Tissues Directive which satisfies these criteria. Offspring numbers will thus be limited in each country to which an individual's sperm is exported by the rules in those countries, and UK sperm banks rarely, if ever, impose additional limits.

Some clinics exchange vials with clinics in other countries by mutual export and import to enable them to use samples from a wider pool of donors.

The offspring of sperm providers have the right to know the identity of the donor when the person reaches the age of 18, if conception occurred after March 31, 2005. Donors who donated before that time (and after August 1, 1991) can remove their own anonymity. Despite fears in the medical profession, the number of donors actually increased after anonymity was removed. In 2007, a parliamentary committee recommended that birth certificates include the identity of the donor, but this has not yet been legislated.

Special permission is required from the HFEA for the export of embryos.

United States
In the United States, there are no regulations governing who may engage in sperm donation. Rather, the American Society for Reproductive Medicine and other expert groups (e.g., American Association of Tissue Banks) provide recommendations and guidelines. The ASRM guidelines limit a donor to 25 live births per population area of 850,000, although this is not enforced by law, there is no central tracking, and it has been estimated that only about 40% of births are reported. It is likely that some donors have over one hundred genetic children.
Some sperm banks impose lower limits; e.g., the Sperm Bank of California has a limit of ten families per donor, and the Rainbow Flag Sperm Bank has a limit of donor children by six different women.

See also
 Sperm donation
 Sperm bank
 Sperm theft
 Egg donor
 Donor conceived person
 Fertility tourism
 Artificial insemination
 Reproductive rights
 IVF
 Surrogacy
 Third party reproduction

References

Sperm donation
Family law by country